Dillanos Coffee Roasters is a company that specializes in coffee roasting, located in Sumner, Washington. The company offers a range of specialty coffee blends and single-origin coffees, including direct trade coffees that, are marketed under the One Harvest Project label. The company employs nearly 70 employees and distributes its coffee to more than 1,500 wholesale accounts around the United States.

History

David Morris opened Dillanos in 1992 with the help of his stepfather, Howard Heyer. Named after Morris's son, Dillon, the business originally consisted of one espresso cart located in front of Heyer's convenience store in Buckley, Washington. Morris and Heyer opened two additional retail outlets the following year.

Chris Heyer, Howard's son and Morris' half-brother, joined the operation shortly after it opened and started roasting with a 20-pound coffee roaster. The brothers originally intended to roast only for their retail stores and a few wholesale customers, but within a few years, decided instead to sell the stores and pursue wholesale roasting full-time. In 2004, Dillanos moved its roasting operation to Sumner, Washington just east of Tacoma. 

In 2011, the company was named Roast Magazine’s Macro Roaster of the Year, presented annually to the U.S.'s top roaster with an output of more than 100,000 pounds as decided by the Roast editorial board.

As of 2012, the company employs nearly 70 people in a  roasting facility. Dillanos roasts its coffee on three roasters — a 120-kilo Diedrich, a 240-kilo Diedrich, and a 25-kilo Probat — and distributes its coffee to standalone operations, chains/franchises, distributors, e-commerce outlets, and grocery stores.

References

Coffee companies of the United States
Companies based in Pierce County, Washington